Joseph Flummerfelt (February 24, 1937 – March 1, 2019) was an American conductor. He taught at Westminster Choir College in Princeton, New Jersey for three decades. He was a co-founder of the Spoleto Festival USA in Charleston, South Carolina in 1977, and its director of choral activities from 1977 to 2013. He was also the chorus master of the Festival dei Due Mondi in Italy from 1971 to 1993. According to The New York Times, he "played an outsize, if not always highly visible, role in American classical music."

References

1937 births
2019 deaths
People from Vincennes, Indiana
DePauw University alumni
American male conductors (music)
20th-century American conductors (music)
21st-century American conductors (music)
20th-century American male musicians
21st-century American male musicians